William Marcus Paul Stewart (né Tubbs; born 8 November 1972) is an English former professional footballer who played as a forward from 1991 until 2011. He is currently Head of Player Development at Yeovil Town.

Stewart played over 500 games and scored over 250 goals in his professional career and had notable spells in the Premier League for Ipswich Town and Sunderland, and was the Premier League's second highest goalscorer for the 2000–01 season. He  also played for Bristol Rovers, Huddersfield Town, Bristol City, Preston North End, Yeovil Town and Exeter City.

Playing career
Stewart signed for Bristol Rovers in 1991, where he played as a regular striker. He had played for England schoolboys. He scored a volley in the 1995 Football League Second Division play-off Final against Huddersfield Town but Rovers lost 2-1. Stewart's goal was his 24th of the season. The next season Huddersfield signed him for £1.2 million. He was a great fan favourite at Huddersfield before being controversially sold to rivals Ipswich Town for £2.5 million in the final run-in at the end of the 1999–2000 season. He was Ipswich's most expensive signing at the time.

Ipswich were promoted to the Premier League at the end of the season ahead of Huddersfield due in no small part to Stewart's goals, with two crucially coming in the 2–2 draw at Bolton Wanderers in the play-off semi-final away leg, and he then scored another in the play-off Final itself. Following Ipswich's promotion, Huddersfield received a further £250,000. He continued his great form for the next season being the Premier League's second top goalscorer (and the division's highest English goalscorer) during 2000–01 with 19 goals for Ipswich, who finished fifth and qualified for the UEFA Cup and leading for many fans to call for him to be included in the England team. The following season saw Ipswich suffer a fall from grace that resulted in relegation, and although Stewart only notched up six league goals, he was still the team's OPTA player of the year for the second successive year.

Following Ipswich's fall from the Premier League, Stewart signed for Sunderland where he had three successful seasons. He played his last game for Sunderland on 8 May 2005, after a successful last season for the club which saw him score 17 goals. He departed Sunderland in good terms after deciding that he was too old to play to a Premier League standard.

Stewart chose to sign for Bristol City, fulfilling his ambition to play for the team which he has supported since he was a boy despite beginning his career with City's neighbours and rivals Bristol Rovers. In March 2006, Stewart moved on-loan to Preston North End until the end of the 2005–06 season. After his return to Bristol he was publicly told by City's manager and chairman that he should seek another club, though he was not formally transfer-listed. In August 2006 he signed for Yeovil Town on a three-month loan and scored a goal on his debut away at Swansea City. He signed a permanent deal with Yeovil in January 2007.

Stewart signed a deal with newly promoted League Two side Exeter City on 14 July 2008.

In February 2009 he was a shock contender to fill the vacant manager's position at Yeovil Town, possibly teaming up with ex-Carlisle United boss John Ward.

Stewart finished the 2008–09 season scoring seven goals for Exeter, taking his career tally to 249 goals, one short of 250. After Exeter's promotion to league one in May 2009, Stewart decided to hold his retirement plans and sign a new one-year deal with the club.

He scored his 250th career goal in the League One game at Carlisle United on 22 August 2009.

Stewart retired from professional football in April 2011, his final appearance being as a substitute for Exeter in a 2–0 win against the first club of his career, Bristol Rovers.

Coaching career
Stewart, already has been involved in some coaching duties as a senior player/coach role in his final two years at Exeter City. After retiring from his playing career, he worked full-time as a first team coach for Exeter.

In July 2012 he joined former club Bristol Rovers as a development coach. In 2013 Stewart was made assistant manager at Bristol Rovers. He left the club by mutual consent in December 2018 along with then manager Darrell Clarke. On 20 May 2019, Stewart re-united with Clarke by joining Walsall as assistant manager.

On 8 June 2022, Stewart joined former club Yeovil Town as Head of Player Development, linking up with new manager Chris Hargreaves who Stewart had worked with at Bristol Rovers.

Personal life
On 8 September 2022, Stewart was diagnosed with motor neurone disease following twelve months of testing.

Honours
Ipswich Town
 Football League First Division play-offs: 2000

Sunderland
 Football League Championship: 2004–05

Exeter City
 Football League Two runner-up: 2008–09

Individual
 Bristol Rovers Player of the Year: 1995–96
 PFA Team of the Year: 1995–96 Second Division, 1999–2000 First Division
 Ipswich Town Player of the Year: 2000–01

References

External links 

 
 

1972 births
Living people
Footballers from Bristol
English footballers
Association football forwards
Bristol Rovers F.C. players
Huddersfield Town A.F.C. players
Ipswich Town F.C. players
Sunderland A.F.C. players
Bristol City F.C. players
Preston North End F.C. players
Yeovil Town F.C. players
Exeter City F.C. players
Premier League players
English Football League players
Exeter City F.C. non-playing staff
Bristol Rovers F.C. non-playing staff
Walsall F.C. non-playing staff
Yeovil Town F.C. non-playing staff
English football managers
People with motor neuron disease